SQ1 may refer to:

Space Quest I, a 1986 video game
SQ1, a galactic quadrant in the Milky Way
SQ1, a mixtape by Lil Wayne
SQ1, a Singapore Airlines flight that flies from Hong Kong to Singapore in the morning, and from San Francisco at night.
Microsoft SQ1, a system on a chip

See also
SQL, special-purpose programming language designed for managing data
Square One (disambiguation)